Gracilaria is a genus of red algae (Rhodophyta) notable for its economic importance as an agarophyte, as well as its use as a food for humans and various species of shellfish. Various species within the genus are cultivated among Asia, South America, Africa and Oceania.

Taxonomy
Gracilaria contains the following subtaxa:

Gracilaria abbottiana M.D.Hoyle
Gracilaria abyssalis Gurgel & Yoneshigue-Valentin
Gracilaria aculeata (Hering) Papenfuss
Gracilaria aggregata Hooker f. & Harvey
Gracilaria ambigua Greville
Gracilaria apiculata P.Crouan & H.Crouan
Gracilaria apiculata subsp. candelabriformis Gurgel, Fredericq & J.N.Norris
Gracilaria apiculifera J.Agardh
Gracilaria arcuata f. rhizophora Børgesen
Gracilaria arcuata var. attenuata Umamaheswara Rao
Gracilaria arcuata var. snackeyi Weber Bosse
Gracilaria arcuata Zanardini
Gracilaria armata (C.Agardh) Greville
Gracilaria articulata C.F.Chang & B.M.Xia
Gracilaria ascidiicola E.Y.Dawson
Gracilaria attenuata (M.Umamaheswara Rao) V.Krishnamurthy
Gracilaria austromaritima Przhemenstskaya
Gracilaria babae (H.Yamamoto) P.-K. Ng, P.-E. Lim & S.-M. Phang
Gracilaria baiana Lyra, Gurgel, M.C.Oliveira & Nunes
Gracilaria beckeri (J.Agardh) Papenfuss
Gracilaria birdiae E.M.Plastino & E.C.Oliveira
Gracilaria blodgettii Harvey
Gracilaria brasiliensis Gurgel & Yoneshigue-Valentin
Gracilaria brevis W.R.Taylor
Gracilaria bursa-pastoris (S.G.Gmelin) P.C.Silva
Gracilaria camerunensis Pilger
Gracilaria canaliculata Sonder
Gracilaria capensis F.Schmitz ex Mazza
Gracilaria capitata Zanardini
Gracilaria cearensis (A.B.Joly & Pinheiro) A.B.Joly & Pinheiro
Gracilaria cerrosiana W.R.Taylor
Gracilaria cervicornis (Turner) J.Agardh
Gracilaria changii (B.M.Xia & I.A.Abbott) I.A.Abbott, J.Zhang & B.M.Xia
Gracilaria chilensis C.J.Bird, McLachlan & E.C.Oliveira
Gracilaria chondracantha (Kützing) A.J.K.Millar
Gracilaria chondroides (Kützing) P.Crouan & H.Crouan
Gracilaria chorda var. exilis Yamamoto
Gracilaria chouae Zhang & B.M.Xia
Gracilaria cliftonii Withell, A.J.K.Millar & Kraft
Gracilaria comosa Withell, A.J.K.Millar & Kraft
Gracilaria compressa var. lyra J.Agardh
Gracilaria conferta (Schousboe ex Montagne) Montagne
Gracilaria confervoides f. ecortica V.M.May
Gracilaria confervoides var. ramulosa Kützing
Gracilaria coppejansii Muangmai, Lewmanomont, Prathep, Terada & Zuccarello
Gracilaria corallicola Zanardini
Gracilaria cornea J.Agardh
Gracilaria corniculata (C.Agardh) J.Agardh
Gracilaria coronopifolia J.Agardh
Gracilaria corticata (J.Agardh) J.Agardh
Gracilaria corticata var. cylindrica Umamaheswara Rao
Gracilaria corticata var. linearis J.Agardh
Gracilaria corticata var. ramalinioides J.Agardh
Gracilaria corymbiata (N.Rodríguez de Rios) E.K.Ganesan
Gracilaria crassa f. conglomerata Børgesen
Gracilaria crassissima (P.Crouan & H.Crouan) P.Crouan & H.Crouan
Gracilaria crispata Setchell & Gardner
Gracilaria crockeri E.Y.Dawson
Gracilaria cuneata Areschoug
Gracilaria cuneifolia (Okamura) I.K.Lee & Kurogi
Gracilaria curtissiae J.Agardh
Gracilaria cylindrica Børgesen
Gracilaria damicornis J.Agardh
Gracilaria dawsonii Hoyle
Gracilaria debilis (Forsskål) Børgesen
Gracilaria dendroides Gargiulo, De Masi & Tripodi
Gracilaria denticulata F.Schmitz ex Mazza
Gracilaria disputabilis (M.Bodard) M.Bodard
Gracilaria disticha (J.Agardh) J.Agardh
Gracilaria divaricata Harvey
Gracilaria divergens (C.Agardh) J.Agardh
Gracilaria domingensis (Kützing) Sonder ex Dickie
Gracilaria dotyi Hoyle
Gracilaria dumosa Harvey & Bailey
Gracilaria dura (C.Agardh) J.Agardh
Gracilaria dura f. prolificans Reinbold
Gracilaria dura var. fruticosa J.Agardh
Gracilaria ecuadoreana (W.R.Taylor) E.Y.Dawson
Gracilaria edulis (S.G.Gmelin) P.C.Silva
Gracilaria ephemera Skelton, G.R.South & A.J.K.Millar
Gracilaria epihippisora Hoyle
Gracilaria excavata (Setchell & Gardner) G.M.Lyra, C.Iha, M.C. Oliveira, J.M.C.Nunes
Gracilaria falconii Ardito, Núñez-Resendiz, Dreckmann & Sentíes
Gracilaria fanii B.M.Xia & Pan
Gracilaria ferox J.Agardh
Gracilaria firma C.F.Chang & B.-M.Xia
Gracilaria fisheri (B.M.Xia & I.A.Abbott) I.A.Abbott, J.Zhang & B.M.Xia
Gracilaria flabelliformis (P.Crouan & H.Crouan) Fredericq & Gurgel
Gracilaria flabelliformis subsp. aionana Gurgel, Fredericq & J.N.Norris
Gracilaria flabelliformis subsp. simplex Gurgel, Fredericq & J.N.Norris
Gracilaria flagelliformis (Sonder) Womersley
Gracilaria flexuosa E.M.Holmes
Gracilaria foliifera (Forsskål) Børgesen
Gracilaria foliifera f. granatea (J.V.Lamouroux) Børgesen
Gracilaria fruticosa Harvey
Gracilaria galetensis Gurgel, Fredericq, & J.N.Norris
Gracilaria gardneri (Setchell) Gurgel, J.N.Norris & Fredericq
Gracilaria gigartinoides (P.Crouan & H.Crouan) P.Crouan & H.Crouan
Gracilaria gigas Harvey
Gracilaria glomerata Zhang & B.M.Xia
Gracilaria gracilis (Stackhouse) Steentoft, L.M.Irvine & Farnham
Gracilaria gurgelii Freshwater
Gracilaria hainanensis C.F.Chang & B.M.Xia
Gracilaria halogenea A.J.K.Millar
Gracilaria hancockii E.Y.Dawson
Gracilaria hauckii P.C.Silva
Gracilaria hayi Gurgel, Fredericq & J.N.Norris
Gracilaria hermonii Millar
Gracilaria heteroclada (Montagne) J.Feldmann & G.Feldmann
Gracilaria hikkaduwensis Durairatnam
Gracilaria howensis A.H.S.Lucas
Gracilaria huangii S.-M.Lin & De Clerck
Gracilaria hummii Hommersand & Freshwater
Gracilaria incrustata J.Agardh
Gracilaria incurvata Okamura
Gracilaria indica M.Umamaheswara Rao
Gracilaria intermedia J.Agardh
Gracilaria intermedia subsp. ganesanana Gurgel, Fredericq & J.Norris
Gracilaria isabellana Gurgel, Fredericq & J.N.Norris
Gracilaria kanyakumariensis Umamaheswara Rao
Gracilaria khanjanapajiae Saengkaew, Muangmai & Zuccarello
Gracilaria kilakkaraiensis V.Krishnamurthy & Rajendran
Gracilaria lacerata Setchell & N.L.Gardner
Gracilaria lantaensis Muangmai, Zuccarello, Noiraksa & Lewmanomont
Gracilaria latifrons P.Crouan & H.Crouan
Gracilaria longa Gargiulo, De Masi & Tripodi
Gracilaria longirostris Zhang & Wang
Gracilaria mammillaris (Montagne) M.Howe
Gracilaria manilaensis Yamamoto & Trono
Gracilaria mannarensis Umamaheswara Rao
Gracilaria maramae G.R.South
Gracilaria marcialana E.Y.Dawson
Gracilaria mayae A.J.K.Millar
Gracilaria megaspora (E.Y.Dawson) Papenfuss
Gracilaria mexicana (Kützing) P.Crouan & H.Crouan
Gracilaria microcarpa Dreckmann, Núñez-Resendiz & Sentíes
Gracilaria microdendron J.Agardh
Gracilaria millardetii (Montagne) J.Agardh
Gracilaria millardetii f. crenulata J.Agardh
Gracilaria millardetii f. exposita Børgesen
Gracilaria millardetii f. latifolia Børgesen
Gracilaria millardetii f. linearifolia J.Agardh
Gracilaria minor (Sonder) Durairatnam
Gracilaria minuta Lewmanomont
Gracilaria mixta I.A.Abbott, J.Zhang & B.M.Xia
Gracilaria multifurcata Børgesen
Gracilaria multipartita (Clemente) Harvey
Gracilaria multipartita f. prolifera E.S.Sinova
Gracilaria multipartita f. supernediliatata E.S.Sinova
Gracilaria multipartita var. crispa (Clemente) Cremades
Gracilaria multipartita var. elongata (Clemente) Cremades
Gracilaria occidentalis (Børgesen) M.Bodard
Gracilaria oliveirarum Gurgel, Fredericq & J.N.Norris
Gracilaria opuntia Durairatnam
Gracilaria ornata Areschoug
Gracilaria pachydermatica Setchell & N.L.Gardner
Gracilaria pacifica I.A.Abbott
Gracilaria palmettoides P.Crouan & H.Crouan
Gracilaria papenfussii I.A.Abbott
Gracilaria parva Freshwater, B.Williamson, P.W.Gabrielson & Margarita Brandt
Gracilaria parvispora I.A.Abbott
Gracilaria patens P.Crouan & H.Crouan
Gracilaria pauciramosa (N.Rodríguez de Ríos) A.M.Bellorin, M.C.Oliveira, & E.C.Oliveira
Gracilaria percurrens (I.A.Abbott) I.A.Abbott
Gracilaria perplexa K.Byrne & Zuccarello
Gracilaria peruana Piccone & Grunow
Gracilaria phuquocensis N.H.Le, N.Muangmai & G.C.Zuccarello
Gracilaria pinnata Setchell & N.L.Gardner
Gracilaria preissiana (Sonder) Womersley
Gracilaria prolifica (Kützing) P.Crouan & H.Crouan
Gracilaria protea J.Agardh
Gracilaria pudumadamensis V.Krishnamurthy & N.R.Rajendran
Gracilaria pulvinata Skottsberg
Gracilaria punctata (Okamura) Yamada
Gracilaria pygmaea Børgesen
Gracilaria ramisecunda E.Y.Dawson
Gracilaria ramulosa (Martius) Greville
Gracilaria rangiferina (Kützing) Piccone
Gracilaria reptans (Weber Bosse) P.C.Silva
Gracilaria rhodocaudata Yamamoto & Kudo
Gracilaria rhodymenioides A.J.K.Millar
Gracilaria robusta Setchell
Gracilaria rubra C.F.Chang & B.M.Xia
Gracilaria rubrimembra E.Y.Dawson
Gracilaria salicornia (C.Agardh) E.Y.Dawson
Gracilaria salzmannii Bornet ex Möbius
Gracilaria secunda (C.Agardh) Zanardini
Gracilaria secundata Harvey
Gracilaria secundata Setchell & N.L.Gardner
Gracilaria shimodensis Terada, R.& Yamamoto, H.
Gracilaria silviae Lyra, Gurgel, M.C.Oliveira & J.M.C.Nunes
Gracilaria skottsbergii W.R.Taylor
Gracilaria spinigera E.Y.Dawson
Gracilaria spinuligera Børgesen
Gracilaria spinulosa (Okamura) Chang & B.-M.Xia
Gracilaria srilankia (C.F.Chang & B.M.Xia) A.F.Withell, A.J.K.Millar & Kraft
Gracilaria stellata I.A.Abbott, Zhang & B.M.Xia
Gracilaria stipitata A.F.Withell, A.J.K.Millar & Kraft
Gracilaria sublittoralis Yamada & Segawa ex H.Yamamoto
Gracilaria subsecundata Setchell & N.L.Gardner
Gracilaria subtilis (B.M.Xia & I.A.Abbott) B.M.Xia & I.A.Abbott
Gracilaria sullivanii Yamamoto & Trono
Gracilaria suzanneae L.P.Soares, C.F.D.Gurgel & M.T.Fujii
Gracilaria symmetrica E.Y.Dawson
Gracilaria taiwanensis S.-M.Lin, L.-C.Liu & Payri
Gracilaria tenuissima Croaun & Crouan
Gracilaria tenuistipitata C.F.Chang & B.-M.Xia
Gracilaria tenuistipitata var. liui Zhang & Xia
Gracilaria tenuistipitata var. tenuistipitata C.F.Chang & B.M.Xia
Gracilaria tepocensis (E.Y.Dawson) E.Y.Dawson
Gracilaria textorii (Suringar) Hariot
Gracilaria textorii f. tenuis V.May
Gracilaria textorii var. cunninghamii (Farlow) E.Y.Dawson
Gracilaria tikvahiae McLachlan
Gracilaria transtasmanica (M.Preuss, N.Muangmai and Zuccarello) G. M.Lyra, C.Iha, J.M.C.Nunes, C.C.Davis
Gracilaria tridactylites P.Crouan & H.Crouan ex J.Agardh
Gracilaria truncata Kraft
Gracilaria tsudae (I.A.Abbott & I.Meneses) I.A.Abbott
Gracilaria tuberculosa (Hampe ex Kützing) J.Agardh
Gracilaria turgida E.Y.Dawson
Gracilaria tuticorinensis V.Krishnamurthy & Rajendran
Gracilaria urvillei (Montagne) I.A.Abbott
Gracilaria usneoides (C.Agardh) J.Agardh
Gracilaria usneoides var. succosa J.Agardh
Gracilaria vanbosseae (I.A.Abbott) I.A.Abbott
Gracilaria veloroae E.Y.Dawson
Gracilaria venezuelensis W.R.Taylor
Gracilaria vermiculata P.J.L.Dangeard
Gracilaria vermiculophylla (Ohmi) Papenfuss
Gracilaria vermiculophylla var. zhengii (J.F.Zhang & B.M.Xia) Yoshida
Gracilaria verrucosa var. procerrima (Esper) M.P.Reis
Gracilaria verrucosa var. ramulosa (C.Agardh) M.P.Reis
Gracilaria vieillardii P.C.Silva
Gracilaria vieirae M.P.Reis
Gracilaria viridis A.Sfriso, M.A.Wolf, K.Sciuto, M.Morabito, C.Andreoli & I.Moro
Gracilaria vivesii M.Howe
Gracilaria webervanbosseae Huisman & G.W.Saunders
Gracilaria wrightii (Turner) J.Agardh
Gracilaria xiae-abbotii G.M.Lyra, J.M.C.Nunes & C.C.Davis
Gracilaria yamamotoi Zhang & B.M.Xia
Gracilaria yinggehaiensis Xia & Wang
Gracilaria yoneshigueana Gurgel, Fredericq & J.N.Norris S

Distribution
Gracilaria are found in warm waters throughout the world, though they also occur seasonally in temperate waters. It can not tolerate temperatures below . Gracilaria are found in all oceans except the Arctic. Its center of diversity is the Western Pacific, where it has been traditionally cultivated as a source of agar.

Use

Gracilaria is used as a food in Filipino, Hawaiian, Japanese, and Korean cuisines. In Japanese cuisine, it is called ogonori or ogo. In the Philippines, it is called gulaman and used to make gelatin. In Jamaica, it is known as Irish moss. In Korea, it is known as kkosiraegi.

Gracilaria oligosaccharides with degree of polymerization 6 prepared by agarase digestion from agar-bearing Gracilaria sp. polysaccharides have been shown to be an effective prophylactic agent during in vitro and in vivo experiments against Japanese encephalitis viral infection. The sulfated oligosaccharides from Gracilaria sp. seem to be promising candidates for further development as antiviral agents.

In Japan, Gracilaria has been used to produce funori, an agar-based glue, since the 17th century.

Aquarium trade
Gracilaria commonly appears as a macroalgae for sale in the aquarium trade. It is a highly palatable algae to tangs and many other herbivorous fish, and its nutrient uptake ability makes it a suitable choice for a refugium.

Ecology
Gracilaria are susceptible to infection by the parasitic oomycete Pythium porphyrae. Reproduction by Gracilaria gracilis is supported by Idotea balthica – the first known case of an animal helping algae reproduce.

References

External links
Gracilaria and its Cultivation (archived at the Internet Archive)
Gracilaria in the Suria Link Sea Plants Handbook (archived at the Internet Archive)

Red algae genera
Edible algae
Seaweeds
Gracilariales
Edible seaweeds
Marine biota of Asia
Marine biota of North America